The 1988 1. divisjon was the 44th completed season of top division football in Norway. The season began on 1 May 1988 and ended on 9 October 1988.

22 games were played with 3 points given for wins and 1 for draws. Number eleven and twelve were relegated. The winners of the two groups of the 2. divisjon were promoted, as well as the winner of a series of play-off matches between the two second placed teams in the two groups of the 2. divisjon and number ten in the 1. divisjon. 

Rosenborg won their 6th title.

Teams and locations
''Note: Table lists in alphabetical order.

League table

Results

Relegation play-offs
Bryne, Start, and Ham-Kam competed in the play-offs. Start won and Bryne were relegated to 2. divisjon.
Results
Match 1: Bryne 1–3 Start
Match 2: HamKam 2–1 Bryne
Match 3: Start 2–1 HamKam

Season statistics

Top scorers

Attendances

References

League table
Fixtures
Goalscorers

Eliteserien seasons
Norway
Norway
1